Cedro refers to the following places:

 Cedro, Ceará, municipality in the state of Ceará, Brazil
 Cedro, Pernambuco, city in the state of Pernambuco, Brazil
 Cedro, Cayey, Puerto Rico, barrio in the municipality of Cayey, Puerto Rico
 Cedro, New Mexico, census-designated place (CDP) in Bernalillo County, New Mexico, United States